Ōka, Ohka,  as a surname may refer to:

  (born 1976), a Major League Baseball player
  (born 1979), a Japanese professional wrestler

See also 
 Oka (surname)
 Ōoka (disambiguation)

Japanese-language surnames